National Highway 353I, commonly referred to as NH 353I is a national highway in India. It is a spur route of National Highway 53. NH-353I traverses the state of Maharashtra in India.

Route 
 Wadi Near AH 46, 
 Hingna, 
 Jamtha, 
 Samruddhi Mahamarg, 
 Outer Ring road, 
 Gumgaon, 
 Salaidhabha, 
 Butibori MIDC, 
 Takalghat, 
 Kapri Moreshwar,
 Asola, 
 Dry Port at Sindi Railway, 
 Pavnar, 
 Surabardi, 
 Alesur,
 Khadgaon, 
 Fetri, 
 NIT College, 
 JIT College.

Junctions  

  Terminal near Wadi.
  Terminal near Pavnar.

See also 

 List of National Highways in India
 List of National Highways in India by state

References

External links 

 NH 353I on OpenStreetMap

National highways in India
National Highways in Maharashtra